Gunestan (also Romanized as Gūnestān; also known as Gūnsebān, Qal‘eh, Qal‘eh Naū, Qal‘eh Now, Qal‘eh Now-e Gūnespān, Qal‘eh Now Gūnesbān, Qal‘eh-ye Now, and Qal‘eh-ye Now Gūnesbān) is a village in Zalian Rural District, Zalian District, Shazand County, Markazi Province, Iran. At the 2006 census, its population was 60, in 14 families.

References 

Populated places in Shazand County